Prado del Rey is the central headquarters of Radiotelevisión Española (RTVE), the Spanish state-owned public broadcasting corporation, and the main production center for its subsidiaries Televisión Española (TVE) and Radio Nacional de España (RNE). The complex is in Pozuelo de Alarcón (Madrid).

History
Prado del Rey was inaugurated on 18 July 1964 to replace the first Televisión Española headquarters located at Paseo de la Habana in Madrid. It was opened by Francisco Franco and the then-Minister of Information and Tourism, Manuel Fraga. with three studios already in operation and another six studios under construction. Studio 1 had an area of 1,200 square meters, which made it the largest studio in Europe at the time. Shows and fiction production was soon transferred there, but the news program Telediario and its news services were not transferred until 1967. In 1971, Radio Nacional de España headquarters was moved to an annex building named Casa de la Radio.

On 13 November 1983, it broadcast the last Telediario news bulletin from Prado del Rey, as TVE news services, then located in the basement of the Casa de la Radio, were moved to the new Torrespaña complex in Madrid at the foot of the communications tower. TVE master control room, the central newsroom, 24 Horas news channel, Telediario and Informe Semanal are located there. In 2019, a plan to transfer them back to Prado del Rey starting in late 2021 was approved.

Buildings

Television building
Televisión Española currently has six television studios and everything related to the production of television content (production rooms, dressing rooms).

Casa de la Radio
It is RNE's central studios. It also keeps the Historical Archives of RNE, separate from the Audiovisual Archives of TVE, which is located in the Archive Building. Its basement was the former home of TVE's news services until its transfer to the Torrespaña complex on 13 November 1983.

Corporation Building
It holds the administrative offices of the corporation.

Archive Building
It keeps the Historical Audiovisual Archive of TVE, separate from the Historical Archives of RNE.

Production trucks Building
It keeps all the technical material used in TVE's broadcasts.

Gallery

References

RTVE
Buildings and structures in Pozuelo de Alarcón
Television studios
Buildings and structures completed in 1964